Lifshitz College of Education ("Michlelet Lifshitz" - מכללת ליפשיץ - המכללה האקדמית הדתית לחינוך) is a religious teacher training college in Jerusalem, Israel.  The school credo is "integrating modernity and Jewish life."

History 
Mizrachi Teachers' Training College was established in Jerusalem in 1921 by Rabbi Moshe Ostrovsky-Hame'iri and Eliezer Meir Lipschütz (mistakenly spelled Lifshitz). It was the first teachers' training college for national religious teachers in the Land of Israel. After Lipschütz's death in 1946, the college was renamed in his honor.

The college is approved by the Council for Higher Education in Israel and offers a range of programs, including fully accredited Bachelor of Education and Master of Education degrees. It conducts research on the methodology and philosophy of Jewish education; it also operates the Lifshitz Center for Jewish Education in the Diaspora.

See also 
 Religious Zionism
 Education in Israel
 Herzog College
 Machon Gold
 Migdal Oz (seminary)
 Michlala
 Midrasha
 Tal Institute
 Talpiot College of Education
 Ein HaNatziv Women's Seminary

References

External links 
 

Colleges in Israel
Orthodox Jewish universities and colleges
Educational institutions established in 1921
1921 establishments in Mandatory Palestine
Orthodox Jewish schools for women